The Archdiocese of Tarragona (Latin, Tarraconensis) is a Roman Catholic ecclesiastical territory located in north-eastern Spain, in the province of Tarragona, part of the autonomous community of Catalonia. The archdiocese heads the ecclesiastical province of Tarragona, having Metropolitan authority over the suffragan dioceses of Girona, Lleida, Solsona, Tortosa, Urgell and Vic.

The archdiocese, created in Roman times, was reestablished in 1118.

History

Roman period (until the 5th century)

Tarragona is one of the most ancient cities of Spain, probably of Iberian origin, as its coins and Cyclopean walls indicate.

The Romans selected Tarragona as the centre of their government in Spain. In the division of the peninsula it was the capital first of Hispania Citerior (Hither Spain) and then of the Province of Hispania Tarraconensis.

The Church of Tarragona is undoubtedly one of the most ancient in Spain, holding as it does the tradition of the coming of St. James and St. Paul. The visit of St. Paul to Tarragona is not altogether beyond the range of possibilities, supposing that he came from Rome to Spain, as he promised to do, in the Epistle to the Romans (Romans 15:24), and as St. Jerome affirms that he did.

The first written testimony which we have concerning the bishops of Tarragona dates from the third century. This is in the Acts of the Martyrdom of the bishop St. Fructuosus and his deacons Augurius and Eulogius. The list of the bishops of Tarragona, therefore, begins with St. Fructuosus, but it is supposed that other bishops, whose names have been lost to us, preceded him.

The see of Tarragona, which was vacant at that time, was represented at the Council of Arles (314) by two procurators, the priest Probatius and the deacon Castorius. Himerius, who sent the priest Basianus to Pope St. Damasus, and who obtained a letter from Pope St. Siricius, was Archbishop of Tarragona in 384.

It is also conjectured that the Hilarius who was the subject of the Decretal issued by Pope Innocent I was also a Bishop of Tarragona. Ascanio was bishop in 465.

In the fifth century Tarragona was overrun by the Vandals, Suevi, and Alani.

Visigoth period (5th to 7th centuries)

The Visigothic king, Euric, took possession of Tarragona in 475 and totally demolished it. During the occupation of the Visigoths it flourished once more.

Previous to 516 we find the name of Archbishop John, who, on 6 November, 516, assembled all the bishops of his province and held the first provincial council of Tarragona, at which ten bishops were present. In 517 he assembled another provincial council in Girona.

Sergius, who was bishop from 535 to 546, held councils in Barcelona and Lleida (546). St. Justus, Bishop of Urgel, dedicated to him his commentary on the Song of Solomon. Tranquillinus was bishop for many years previous to 560. He had been a monk in the Monastery of Asana, under the direction of St. Victornus.

Artemius, bishop prior to 589, was not able to attend the Third Council of Toledo (589), but sent a substitute, Stephen. He called provincial councils at Zaragoza (599) and Barcelona.

Eusebius (610–632) held the council of Egara (Terrassa) to enforce the canons of the Council of Huesca. Audax (633–638) was present at the Fourth Council of Toledo (633), and Protasius (637–646) at the Sixth (638) and Seventh (646) Councils of Toledo. Cyprianus (680–688) sent representatives to the Thirteenth (683), Fourteenth (684), and Fifteenth (688) councils of Toledo. Vera assisted personally at the Sixteenth (693) and Seventeenth (694).

Muslim period (c. 719 – 1116)

In time of Vera or in that of his successor, George, the Muslim invasion took place. The Arabs destroyed Tarragona in 719.

Louis the Pious appears to have temporarily taken possession of the city. A portion of its territory was bestowed on the Bishop of Barcelona, and the metropolitan rank was given to the Bishop of Narbonne, but was recovered in 759.

Caesarius endeavoured to obtain recognition as titular Archbishop of Tarragona, but was not successful, although he was consecrated by the bishops of Leon and Galicia, and obtained from the pope the abbey of Santa Cecilia, which belonged to the Archbishop of Tarragona.

Borrell, Count of Barcelona, induced Pope John XIII to confer the title of Archbishop of Tarragona on Atton, bishop of Vich in 957–971, although he never was called Archbishop of Tarragona but of Ausona.

Berengarius of Rosanes, Bishop of Vich in c. 1078–c. 1099, petitioned Pope Urban II for permission to promote a crusade for the reconquest of Tarragona. Count Berenguer Ramón II the Fratricide succeeded in taking the city and made it a fief of the Holy See. The pope, in recognition of the efforts of the Bishop of Vich, conferred on him the pallium as Archbishop of Tarragona, transferring to him all rights to the city and its churches which had previously belonged to the Holy See. The new bishop, however, was to remain in possession of the Church of Vich.

A similar concession was granted to St. Olegarius, Bishop of Barcelona in 1116–1137, who was permitted to retain possession of his former Church until he had obtained complete and peaceful possession of that of Tarragona, of which he had been named Archbishop.

Archdiocese of Tarragona (since 1116)

It was not until 1116 that Tarragona was definitively reconquered by Ramón Berenguer III the Great. Bishop Berenguer had died in 1110, after having assisted, in 1096, at the Council of Nîmes convoked by Pope Urban II.

His successor in the See of Tarragona, St. Olegarius, had been a canon regular at St. Rufus in Provence, later an abbot, and then Bishop of Barcelona in 1116–1137. To him is due the restoration of the metropolitan authority of Tarragona. In 1117 Count Ramón Berenguer III conferred on him the government of the city that he might endeavour to recolonize it, which work he carried on with great zeal.

He assisted at the councils of Toulouse and Reims (1109), of the Lateran (1123), and of Clermont (1130), and accompanied the Count of Barcelona as pontifical legate in the war which terminated in the imposition of a tribute upon Tortosa and Lleida. The Norman Robert Burdet also joined the forces of the Count of Barcelona, established himself in Tarragona and obtained dominion over a great part of the city.

On the death of St. Olegarius (6 March 1137), Gregory, Abbot of Saint-Michel-de-Cuxa, succeeded him in the vacant See of Tarragona, and was the first incumbent of that see to receive the title of archbishop.

The dissensions among the sons of Robert Burdet led to the murder by them of Archbishop Hugo de Cervellón 22 April 1171.

By special privilege of the pope, all the kings of Aragon were crowned at Zaragoza by the archbishop of Tarragona, until the metropolitan See of Zaragoza was re-established in 1318.

The dissensions between the archbishops and the kings, on account of the jurisdiction over Tarragona granted to the bishops who had begun its resettlement, continued during the time of king Alfonso II of Aragon, who bestowed the city as a dowry on his wife, Doña Sancha.

When king Jaime I, a child of six years, took the oath, the Archbishop of Tarragona, Don Aspargo Barca (1215–1233), carried him in his arms. Although he was far advanced in his years, he wished to accompany the king in his expedition to conquer Majorca, and when Don Jaime refused his consent, he contributed a thousand marks in gold and twelve hundred armed men.

In 1242 a provincial council was convoked at Tarragona to regulate the procedure of the Inquisition and canonical penances. In 1312 a provincial council was assembled in the Corpus Christi Chapel of the cathedral cloister, to pass sentence on the Templars, whom it declared innocent.

King Pedro IV the Ceremonious, who, after forcibly seizing the dominions of the archbishop, repented in his last illness and restored to St.Tecla, patroness of the city, all that he had unjustly acquired.

Don Pedro Zagarriga, Archbishop of Tarragona in 1407–1418, was one of the arbitrators at the Compromise of Caspe (1412).

One of the most celebrated prelates of Tarragona,  Antonio Agustín y Albanell (died 1586), a native of Zaragoza, was an eminent jurisconsult and numismatist. He put an end to the struggles referred to in Don Quixote, between the Narros and Cadells factions, which had disturbed the peace of Catalonia.

In 1912 it was bounded on the north by Barcelona and Lleida, on the east by Barcelona, on the south by the Mediterranean Sea and Tortosa, and on the west by Tortosa. It comprised the civil Provinces of Tarragona and Lleida, and the city of Tarragona had 24,335 inhabitants. Its suffragans were Barcelona, Lleida, Girona, Urgell, Vic, Tortosa and Solsona.

Archbishops of Tarragona (6th century – c. 712)
All the names in italics are given in Spanish:

 . c. 259 : St. Fructuosus
 . c. 385 : Himerius of Tarragona — (before 385)
 . c. 402 : Hilarius of Tarragona
 . c. 420 : Ticiano of Tarragona
 . c. 465 : Ascanio of Tarragona
 470–520 : John
 520–555 : Sergius — (or 535–546)
 560–580 : Tranquillinus of Tarragona — (c. 560 – after 580)
 589–599 : Artemius of Tarragona
 . c. 599 : Asiático
 610–632 : Eusebius of Tarragona — (c. 610? – c. 632)
 . c. 633 : Audax — (Mentioned in the Fourth Council of Toledo of 633, or 633–638)
 . c. 635 : Selva — (Mentioned in 635)
 637–646 : Protasius — (assisted to the Sixth (638) and Seventh (646) Councils of Toledo)
 646–668 : Faluax — (646–668?)
 668–688 : Cyprianus — (or 680–688)
 . c. 693 : Vera – (Mentioned in the Sixteenth (693) and Seventeenth (694) Councils of Toledo)
 711– . . . . : Próspero, Saint — (711–unknown)

In 711 the Muslim invasion took place, and the Arabs destroyed Tarragona in 719.

Bishops of Tarragona (8th to 11th centuries)

 956–unknown : Caesarius 
 970–971 : Atton — (also bishop of Vich in 957–971)
 1091–1099 : Berenguer Seniofredo de Llusá — (also Berengarius of Rosanes, also bishop of Vich in c. 1078–c. 1099)

Archbishops of Tarragona (since 1118)
Count Ramón Berenguer III the Great took Tarragona in 1116.

 1118–1137 : Olegarius, Saint — (also bishop of Barcelona in 1116–1137)
 1143–1146 : Gregory
 1146–1163 : Bernardo Tort
 1163–1171 : Hugo de Cervelló — (also Hugo de Cervellón)
 1171–1174 : Guillermo de Torroja
 1174–1194 : Berenguer de Vilademuls
 1194–1198 : Ramón Xedmar de Castelltersol
 1199–1215 : Ramón de Rocabertí
 1215–1233 : Asparec de la Barca — (also Aspargo Barca)
 1235–1237 : Raymond of Penyafort, O.P.
 1237–1239 : Guillermo de Montgrí
 1238–1251 : Pedro de Albalat
 1251–1268 : Benito de Rocabertí
 1272–1287 : Bernardo de Olivella
 1288–1308 : Rodrigo Tello
 1309–1315 : Guillermo de Rocabertí
 1317–1327 : Jimeno Martínez de Luna y Aragón
 1327–1334 : Juan de Aragón
 1334–1346 : Arnaldo Sescomes
 1346–1357 : Sancho López de Ayerbe
 1357–1380 : Pedro Clasquerí
 1388–1407 : Eneco de Vallterra
 1407–1418 : Pedro de Sagarriga y Pau — (also Pedro Zagarriga)
 1419–1431 : Dalmacio de Mur y de Cervelló
 1431–1433 : Gonzalo Fernández de Hijar
 1434–1445 : Domingo Ram y Lanaja
 1445–1489 : Pedro de Urrea
 1490–1511 : Gonzalo Fernández de Heredia y de Bardají
 1512–1514 : Alfonso de Aragón y Sánchez
 1515–1530 : Pedro Folc de Cardona
 1531–1532 : Luis Folc de Cardona y Enríquez
 1533–1558 : Girolamo Doria
 1560–1567 : Fernando de Loaces y Pérez
 1567–1568 : Bartolomé Sebastián de Aroitia
 1568–1575 : Gaspar Cervantes de Gaeta
 1576–1586 : Antonio Agustín y Albanell
 1587–1603 : Joan Terès i Borrull
 1604–1611 : Juan de Vic y Manrique
 1613–1622 : Juan de Moncada y Gralla
 1624–1626 : Juan de Hoces
 1627–1633 : Juan Guzmán (archbishop)
 1633–1637 : Antonio Pérez (archbishop)
 1653–1663 : Francisco de Rojas y Artés
 1663–1679 : Juan Manuel de Espinosa y Manuel
 1680–1694 : José Sanchís y Ferrandis
 1695–1710 : José Llinás y Aznar
 1712–1719 : Isidoro de Beltrán
 1720–1721 : Miguel Juan de Taverner y Rubí
 1721–1728 : Manuel de Samaniego y Jaca
 1728–1753 : Pedro de Copons y Copons
 1753–1762 : Jaime de Cortada y Bru
 1763–1764 : Lorenzo Despuig y Cotoner
 1764–1777 : Juan Lario y Lanzis
 1779–1783 : Joaquín de Santiyán y Valdivielso
 1785–1803 : Francisco Armañá y Font
 1804–1816 : Romualdo Mon y Velarde
 1818–1819 : Antonio Bergosa y Jordán
 1820–1825 : Jaime Creus Martí
 1826–1854 : Antonio Fernando de Echanove y de Zaldívar
 1857–1864 : José Domingo Costa y Borrás
 1864–1870 : Francisco Fleix y Solans
 1875–1878 : Constantino Boney y Zanuy
 1879–1888 : Benito Vilamitjana y Vila
 1889–1911 : Tomás Costa y Fornaguera
 1913–1918 : Antolín López Peláez
 1919–1943 : Francisco Vidal y Barraquer
 1944–1948 : Manuel Arce y Ochotorena
 1949–1970 : Benjamín de Arriba y Castro
 1970–1983 : José Pont y Gol
 1983–1996 : Ramón Torrella Cascante
 1997–2004 : Lluís Martínez Sistach
 2004–2019 : Jaume Pujol Balcells
 2019–present : Joan Planellas i Barnosell

See also
 List of the Roman Catholic dioceses of Spain.

References

This article draws only from other Wikipedia articles and these two sources:
  Catholic Encyclopedia, 1912: Tarragona
  IBERCRONOX: Arzobispado de Tarragona (Tarraco)

Sources and external links
 Archdiocese of Tarragona Official Website

Roman Catholic dioceses in Catalonia
Roman Catholic dioceses in Spain